The Chickenfoot Summer Tour 2009 (also known as the Summer Tour 2009) was a worldwide concert tour by the American supergroup Chickenfoot featuring guitarist Joe Satriani, former Van Halen members singer Sammy Hagar and bassist Michael Anthony as well as Red Hot Chili Peppers drummer Chad Smith. The tour took place to promote their debut studio album Chickenfoot, released in 2009. The Rock band played a series of concerts in both North America and Europe spanning from June until December 2009. It followed the sell-out Road Test Tour which took place in spring of 2009.

Background 
Before going on an international world tour in 2009, the band organized a series of shows in the United States to seak critical acclaim and reaction of their fans. These nine dates which took place in the spring of 2009 were titled as the Chickenfoot Road Test Tour 2009. As the tour was quickly sold out, the band shared in a press release on April 21, 2009: "The band was blown away by your response and can't wait to take the show on the road. Chickenfoot will be back […]". On June 5, 2009, Chickenfoot promoted both the upcoming album as well as the summer tour on the program Tonight Show with Conan O'Brien.

On November 6, 2009, the band promoted their final concerts on the show Jimmy Kimmel Live!. Ultimately, the Chickenfoot Summer Tour 2009 was announced on June 3, 2009. The tour started with a total of 14 planned shows in Europe before the tour would be concluded in North America with two shows in Canada, 31 shows in the United States as well as one show in Mexico. In Europe, the band played in Austria, Ireland, England, the Netherlands, Italy, Belgium, France, Sweden and Switzerland. However, some of the shows were cancelled (see notes).

Set list 
This set list is representative of the show on 23 September 2009.

 "Avenida Revolucion"
 "Sexy Little Thing"
 "Soap on a Rope"
 "My Kinda Girl"
 "Down the Drain"
 "Bitten By The Wolf"
 "Oh Yeah"
 "Learning to Fall"
 "Get It Up"
 "Turnin' Left"
 "Future in the Past"
 "Bad Motor Scooter"
 "My Generation"

Tour dates

Notes

References

External links 
 Official Chickenfoot website

2009 concert tours